Augusto Nicolini (born 29 September 1972) is a Peruvian sailor. He competed in the Laser event at the 2004 Summer Olympics.

References

External links
 

1972 births
Living people
Peruvian male sailors (sport)
Olympic sailors of Peru
Sailors at the 2004 Summer Olympics – Laser
Sportspeople from Lima